Tangra Blues is a 2021 Indian Bengali language musical-thriller film directed by Supriyo Sen for producers  Shree Venkatesh Films. Starring Parambrata Chatterjee and Madhumita Sarcar, the film revolves around music-maker Joyee (Madhumita Sarcar) and a music band leader Sanjib Mondal (Parambrata Chatterjee). It was released on 15 April 2021, coinciding with Bangla Noboborsho.

Synopsis

The story of the film is about a musical band in a slum of Kolkata. It follows the band leader, Sanjib Mondal (Parambrata Chatterjee), and a music-maker, Joyee (Madhumita Sarkar). She is drawn by the performances of the band members, who are slum kids. Then begins their musical journey and fight for a confident future in the shadows of vicious gang wars.

Cast
 Parambrata Chatterjee as Sanjib Mondal.
 Madhumita Sarcar as Joyee
 Samiul Alam as Chalu
 Oishani Dey as Pori
 Atmadeep Ghosh as Nobby

Production
The film shot in a slum of Kolkata, is directed by National Award winning director Supriyo Sen. The lead actor of the film Parambrata Chatterjee said, “Shooting for Tangra Blues has been a memorable experience with challenges and fun at the same time.”

Crew 
Sohini Mukherjee was brought onboard to serve as the Associate Director. Anindit roy was signed to compose the music for the film. The technical team of the film consists of cinematographer Ranjan Palit, editor Sumit Chowdhury and production designer Riddhie Basak.

Reception
Sankhayan Ghosh of Film Companion terming it as 'A ‘Well-Made’ Film Without A Soul' wrote, "Supriyo Sen’s film, starring Parambrata Chatterjee, plays like an uneasy alliance between two different schools of filmmaking". Ishita Sengupta writing for The Indian Express found the film 'a rare outing which seamlessly accommodates current politics in the narrative'. Sengupta praising the performance of Samiul Alam as Charles Murmu, concluded, "In a country where poverty is in abundance, rage is the only byproduct and music a singular avenue that can camouflage a scream for a note. If only it hit better."

Soundtrack

The music of the film is composed by Nabarun Bose. The first single, whose music is inspired by Sanjay Mandal Group and lyrics by Pranjal was released on 8 April 2021. Subsequently the other tracks were released.

Awards and nominations

References

External links
 
 

2021 films
2020s Bengali-language films
Bengali-language Indian films
Indian musical films 
Indian thriller films
2020s musical films
Films shot in Kolkata